Mercy-Man is an Tajikistani comic book series by Jaihun "James" Nashimi. Mercy-Man is Tajikistan's first superhero and was published on August 30, 2018.

Plot
Jahongir better known as Jahon was an Tajikistani boy (with a mental condition) who was adopted by American parents after his grandparents past away. Little did he know, his mental condition will later turned into superpowers. He later becomes Mercy-Man. He builds a robot. However, Ken Richter uses the robot for world domination. Mercy-Man has to fight corrupt organizations back.

References

Comics characters
Tajikistani literature
Fictional Tajikistani people
2018 comics debuts
Asian-American superheroes
Fictional orphans
Comics characters introduced in 2018
Fictional characters with neurological or psychological disorders
Fictional telepaths
Fictional American scientists and engineers